Golden Security Bank was a  bank headquartered in Rosemead, California, with operations in Southern California. The bank catered to Chinese-Americans in low- and moderate-income areas. In 2011, the bank was acquired by First General Bank.

History
The bank was established on August 27, 1982 in the Chinatown neighborhood of Los Angeles.

In October 2005, the bank's headquarters were moved to Rosemead, California.

In 2009, state regulators ordered the company to raise capital.

In 2011, the bank was acquired by First General Bank.

References

Banks established in 1982
Chinese American banks
Chinese-American culture in California
1982 establishments in California
Defunct banks of the United States
Banks disestablished in 2011
2011 mergers and acquisitions